Daniella Dooling (born 1967) is an American artist. Her work is held in the permanent collections of the Metropolitan Museum of Art and the Whitney Museum of American Art.

References

External links
 Official website

Living people
1967 births
20th-century American artists
20th-century American women artists
21st-century American women